Augustus Edward Hough Love FRS (17 April 1863, Weston-super-Mare – 5 June 1940, Oxford), often known as A. E. H. Love, was a mathematician famous for his work on the mathematical theory of elasticity. He also worked on wave propagation and his work on the structure of the Earth in Some Problems of Geodynamics won for him the Adams prize in 1911 when he developed a mathematical model of surface waves known as Love waves. 
Love also contributed to the theory of tidal locking and introduced the parameters known as Love numbers, used in problems related to Earth tides, the tidal deformation of the solid Earth due to the gravitational attraction of the Moon and Sun.

He was educated at Wolverhampton Grammar School and in 1881 won a scholarship to St John's College, Cambridge, where he was at first undecided whether to study classics or mathematics. His successful progress (he was placed Second Wrangler) vindicated his choice of mathematics, and in 1886 he was elected Fellow of the college. In 1899 he was appointed Sedleian Professor of Natural Philosophy in the University of Oxford, a position which he retained until his death in 1940. He was also a Fellow of Queen's College.

He authored the two volume classic, A Treatise on the Mathematical Theory of Elasticity. He was the author of several articles in the 1911 Encyclopædia Britannica, including Elasticity and Infinitesimal Calculus.

His other awards include the Royal Society Royal Medal in 1909 and Sylvester Medal in 1937, and the London Mathematical Society De Morgan Medal in 1926. He was secretary to the London Mathematical Society between 1895 and 1910, and president for 1912–1913.

Further reading
A.E.H. Love, "Theoretical mechanics, an introductory treatise on the principles of theoretical dynamics", 1897, Cambridge University Press
A.E.H. Love, "Some problems of geodynamics", first published in 1911 by the Cambridge University Press and published again in 1967 by Dover, New York, USA.

See also
Twist (mathematics)

References 

1863 births
1940 deaths
People from Weston-super-Mare
19th-century British mathematicians
20th-century British mathematicians
Fellows of the Royal Society
Alumni of St John's College, Cambridge
Fellows of St John's College, Cambridge
Fellows of The Queen's College, Oxford
Sedleian Professors of Natural Philosophy
People educated at Wolverhampton Grammar School
Royal Medal winners
Second Wranglers
De Morgan Medallists
Geodynamics